Frank George John Salvat  (30 October 1934 – 24 April 2013) was a British athlete who represented Great Britain in the 5,000m the 1960 Summer Olympics in Rome, finishing seventh in his heats. He was born in Edgware.

Salvat was a magazine designer in London and the Amateur Athletics Association three mile champion before competing in international events, running for Great Britain against France in the 5,000m at White City and in the Olympics later that year. He was a member of Finchley Harriers, now Hillingdon Athletic Club, in northwest London.

Athletics agent Eric Shirley Jr, whose father Eric Shirley was Salvat's training partner, said: "He was an amazing man with an amazing amount of charisma. His pre-race diet, two hours before he competed, even at the very highest international level, would be a pie and a pint. It's not unknown for him to start a race with a brandy glass in his hand, hand it over to someone, and even have a cigar waiting for him at the end."

Salvat died in poverty in Hurstpierpoint, West Sussex on 24 April 2013. Nobody claimed his body after his death and he would have had a pauper's funeral, but pubs and businesses in Hurstpierpoint, as well as his former athletics club, raised money for a funeral and a wake.

References

External links
 Salvat in action at the AAA at White City, 1960 on the Pathé news website

1934 births
2013 deaths
English male long-distance runners
Athletes (track and field) at the 1960 Summer Olympics
Olympic athletes of Great Britain
People from Edgware
Athletes from London